St Mary the Virgin is a parish church in the Church of England in Wirksworth, Derbyshire. It is a Grade I listed building. The existing building dates mostly from the 13th–15th centuries, but notable survivals from the Anglo-Saxon period indicate a church has stood on this site since at least the 8th century AD. It was restored in 1820, then in 1870 by Sir Gilbert Scott.

Description

The church is notable for its Anglo-Saxon carvings, and a large Anglo-Saxon coffin lid which was discovered under the chancel floor near the sanctuary in 1820. It is now mounted on the north wall of the nave. It appears to date from the second half of the 7th century. The church is also noted for containing an Anglo-Saxon carving of a lead miner, "T'owd Man", the oldest representation of a miner anywhere in the world. It was moved here in 1863 from Bonsall church for safe-keeping and has never been returned. The parishioners of Bonsall have had a replica carved for their church.
The church also contains numerous early medieval and medieval carvings, many fragments of larger pieces, that have been grouped together and inserted for display in the transept walls. These include fragments of early medieval stone crosses and medieval grave slabs, figures of a wise man and shepherd, and the face of a bearded man.

It is one of the few remaining churches in Britain which still performs the ancient custom of clipping the church. This takes place on the first Sunday after 8 September, the Sunday after the Feast of the Nativity of the Blessed Virgin Mary.

The nave roof was replaced in 2020, following leaks which threatened to damage the church interior. A traditional topping out ceremony was held with the Bishop of Derby on 18 August 2020.

The church has commissioned a new poem about the tower and bells of St Mary's.

Memorials

In the north aisle are the tombs of the Gell family. Sir Anthony Gell (d. 1583) has his statue on his tomb. Alongside is the simpler tomb of his father, Sir Ralph Gell.

The chancel contains the tomb of Anthony Lowe, a Gentleman of the Bedchamber who served Henry VII, Henry VIII, Edward VI and Mary I and died in 1555.

Abraham Bennet, the inventor of the gold-leaf electroscope and developer of an improved magnetometer.

The churchyard contains the tomb of Matthew Peat of Alderwasley, who died 11 December 1751, at an alleged age of 109 years and 10 months.

Parish status
The church is in a joint parish with
All Saints' Church, Alderwasley
St James the Apostle's Church, Bonsall
All Saints' Church, Bradbourne
All Saints’ Church, Ballidon
St James’ Church, Brassington
St Margaret's Church, Carsington
All Saints’ Church, Elton
St James’ Church, Idridgehay
Holy Trinity Church, Kirk Ireton
Holy Trinity Church, Middleton-by-Wirksworth

Vicars
This list is taken from the list displayed by the South Porch door inside the church, except where noted otherwise.

1270 Nicholas de Oxton
1272 Richard de Middleton
1275 William Godman
1287 Appointment made but name not recorded
1295 Appointment made but name not recorded
1299 Robert de Bradborn
1313 Milo de Leicester
1326 John de Hale
1349 Robert de Darbi
???? Robert de Irton
1362 Robert Spondai
???? Thomas Chastelton
1397 John Sotheren
???? John Howes
1410 Bartholomew Lyburgh
???? John Masson
1422 John Rolf
1432 Thomas Eyton
1487 Richard Smyth
1504 James Baresforthe
1520 Anthony Draycott
1560 John Hyron
1577 Michael Harrison DD
1600 Tobias Stoyte
1615 William Parker
1619 Richard Caryer
1633 Robert Topham
1650 Martin Topham
1660 Peter Wilkinson
1667 Thomas Brown (or Browne; Archdeacon)
1689 William Browne
1705 Richard Willis
1714 John Inett
1718 Thomas Inett
1746 Thomas Harris
1778 Richard Tillard
1787 Richard Kaye
1790 John Chaloner
1815 George de Smith Kelley
1824 Henry Gordon
1831 William Edward Nassau Molesworth
1831 John Harward
1851 Thomas Tunstall Smith
1893 William Harry Arkwright
1902 Hubert Arnold Gem (previously vicar of All Saints' Church, Nottingham)
1913 Thomas Beedham Charlesworth
1917 Herbert Ham
1925 Arthur Lionel Edwards
1935 Stephen Langrish Caiger
1951 Geoffrey Busby
1984 Robert S. Caney (Rector)

Organ

In 1826 a two-manual organ was installed by Thomas Elliot. It cost £400 (equivalent to £ as of ), raised by subscriptions, and was placed in the tower of the church, but it was removed in 1853 to a more convenient location in the nave.

The church had a three-manual 26-speaking-stop tubular pneumatic-action pipe organ installed in the north transept in 1899 by Brindley & Foster. It was rebuilt in 1955 by Kingsgate Davidson with electric action.

This organ was replaced in 1987 by a three-manual 48-speaking-stop Makin electronic digital organ.

Organists
George Frederick Simms ????–1832 (afterwards organist of St Oswald's Church, Ashbourne)
Thomas Reeves 1832–60
Edward Birch 1860–78
Nicholas Mason Day 1878–98
Carl Ashover 1899–1916
F. Isherwood-Plummer 1920–1922 (previously organist of St Alkmund's Church, Derby)
Edward S. Jones c. 1923–36
Hingley James 1936–????
Harold Udall Ogdon
Christopher Dixon 1980–present

See also
Grade I listed churches in Derbyshire
Grade I listed buildings in Derbyshire
Listed buildings in Wirksworth

References

Church of England church buildings in Derbyshire
Wirksworth
Anglo-Saxon art
St Mary's Church